The Sacred Heart Girls Higher Secondary School in Thanjavur, India, is an educational institute. The administration is under Franciscan Missionaries of Mary. The institution has Kindergarten, Primary school, High School and Higher Secondary. The institute provides co-educational teaching only for Kindergarten and Primary school. High school and higher secondary is not co-educational. Lessons are taught in Tamil and English.

Sacred Heart Girls` Higher Secondary School, recognized under the Madras Educational rules is a minority institution under the direction of the Franciscan Missionaries of Mary in the Roman Catholic Diocese of Thanjavur. The school was founded in the year 1937 with the primary objective of serving the poor and the sick, socially backward and needy students irrespective of caste, Creed and religion.

'Towards Truth and Charity'is the motto of the school. The aim of the school is (1) imparting quality education to children irrespective of caste and creed to attain academic excellence (2) instilling social values like  justice, truth, love, peace, dignity, religious harmony and national integration and concern for the weaker sections of the society (3) training young minds to be agents of social change by fostering -Justice, Peace and Integrity of Creation (JPIC) as a way of life (4) sensitizing the students with vital environmental issues and helping them to play a useful role in protecting the environment (5) inculcating right relationship among people and with nature;truth, love, tolerance and the ethic of enough as values;communal harmony true respect for all religions and classes of people; human rights and dignity of each individual;and concern for the poor of the locality (6) helping young girls to grow with the high sense of duty and citizenship in an atmosphere of joyous freedom conducive to personality development and fulfilment, through self control and self direction, leading to spontaneous involvement of all pupils in the institution and discipline of the school.

See also
 Thanjavur student suicide case

References

Franciscan high schools
Catholic secondary schools in India
Christian schools in Tamil Nadu
Primary schools in Tamil Nadu
High schools and secondary schools in Tamil Nadu
Education in Thanjavur
Educational institutions established in 1937
1937 establishments in India